Do Gush or Dogush may refer to:
 Do Gush, Behbahan, Khuzestan Province
 Do Gush, Markazi